Tidore is a language of North Maluku, Indonesia, spoken by the Tidore people. The language is centered on the island of Tidore, but it is also spoken in some areas of the neighbouring Halmahera. A North Halmahera language, it is unlike most languages in Indonesia which belong to the Austronesian language family. Tidore and other North Halmahera languages are perhaps related to languages of the Bird's Head Peninsula, West Papua.

It is closely related to Ternate, of which it is sometimes considered a dialect. Both Ternate and Tidore have been recorded in writing at least since the late 15th century, being the only Papuan languages with indigenous literary traditions.

Phonology

Consonants 

A flap consonant can be heard as alveolar or post-alveolar .

Vowels

References

Languages of Indonesia
North Halmahera languages